Lester Anthony Beardslee (February 1, 1836 – November 10, 1903) was an officer in the United States Navy who served as the commander of the Department of Alaska and of  from June 14, 1879, to September 12, 1880.

Life 

Beardslee was born in Little Falls, New York.

He was appointed acting midshipman in March 1850. While serving aboard , he participated in the Perry Expedition, joining Commodore Matthew C. Perry during his landing at Kurihama, Japan in July 1853. He graduated from the United States Naval Academy in 1856.

From 1870 to 1871, he commanded , his ship becoming the first US Navy ship to sail through the recently completed Suez Canal. While serving as the commander of the Department of Alaska, he explored Alaska's waters. He gave Glacier Bay, which is the focus of Glacier Bay National Park and Preserve today, its distinctive name in 1880. He also named Spuhn island in Gastineau Channel. 

After relinquishing his command in Alaska, he was promoted to captain in November 1880 and to commodore in January 1894. His final post was as Commander of the Pacific Squadron from 1894 to 1897. He kept his flag on USS Philadelphia and was instrumental in choosing Port Angeles Harbor as a location for naval practice.

Beardslee was promoted to rear admiral in May 1895. He retired in February 1898. He died on November 10, 1903.

References

Further reading 
 Hamersly, Lewis Randolph. The Records of Living Officers of the U.S. Navy and Marine Corps. New York, 1902, p. 54.

External links

1836 births
1903 deaths
Commanders of the Department of Alaska
United States Naval Academy alumni
United States Navy officers